Marty Riessen was the defending champion, but lost in the final this year.

Jimmy Connors won the title, beating Björn Borg 7–6(7–5), 6–4, 6–0 in the final.

Seeds

Draw

Finals

Top half

Section 1

Section 2

Bottom half

Section 3

Section 4

External links
 Main draw

U.S. Pro Indoor
1976 World Championship Tennis circuit
U.S. Pro Indoor Singles
1976 in American tennis